Orange Sky Laundry is a charity based in Brisbane, Australia that offers a free mobile laundry service for the homeless. It was established on 4 September 2014 and began operations on 10 October 2014. In January 2016 its founders, Nic Marchesi and Lucas Patchett, were awarded joint Young Australians of the Year for their social entrepreneurship.

Background 
Marchesi describes himself and Patchett as "two normal everyday blokes who had a crazy idea". They had previously volunteered at food vans and other outreach programs while still at school, and had a passion to help the homeless. Their idea "started as a fun test project — to see if it would work. From there, it took a life of its own.” They took the name for their service from the Alexi Murdoch song "Orange Sky", which is about lending a hand to those in need.

Orange Sky Laundry is a government registered charity. The service is believed to be a world first.
 
In February 2015, five months after they started with the first van in Brisbane in October 2014,  and two weeks after their expansion into Cairns, Cyclone Marcia hit the central Queensland coast and the then 20-year-olds headed to the area to offer their free service to affected communities. Similarly, in January 2016, they travelled to Victoria to provide laundry services to people affected by the Great Ocean Road bushfires.

The laundry vans filled a service gap and not only offered clean clothes and blankets but also dignity. Marchesi says the human connections enabled to the isolated is the most important aspect of their initiative. Each van also carries six orange chairs. During the time the laundry is being washed and dried in the vans, the volunteers sit and socialise with the visitors.

Expansion 
Orange Sky began operating its second van (in Cairns) by February 2015, and its third in Melbourne in June. Their first birthday, and World Homeless Day 2015, were celebrated with a new service in south east Victoria, funded by partners The Good Guys (who provided half of the funding for the van), the Jelley Family Foundation, and the Bennelong Foundation. Other vans began operating in Sydney in November 2015, Gold Coast in January 2016, Perth in February 2016, Adelaide in March 2016, Sunshine Coast in April 2016, Canberra in April 2016, and Hobart in July 2016.

By July 2016, Orange Sky had 10 vans and 600 volunteers, and were estimated to be washing nearly six tonnes of laundry each week. They now have 13 vans servicing 121 locations with over 800 volunteers.  there are services in all Australian states plus the Australian Capital Territory. They have plans to expand to the US.

Awards 
On Australia Day 2016, the two co-founders were jointly named Young Australians of the Year. In their acceptance speeches after being announced as winners by the Australian prime minister, Malcolm Turnbull, Patchett said "we can restore respect, raise health standards and be a catalyst for conversation". Marchesi continued "It's so crazy and humbling to think such a simple idea has had such a significant impact".

In June 2016 they were invited to Frankfurt, Germany to receive a Global Best Practices Award: Special Award for Corporate Social Responsibility.

In October 2018, Orange Sky was given the People's Choice Award in the Google Impact Challenge Australia.

Orange Sky Showers
On 23 August 2016, Orange Sky launched a new mobile service: free hot showers for the homeless.
One of the homeless to first try the shower van described it as "bloody awesome". The first van is being trialled in Brisbane, but will then be permanently moved to Melbourne as it was funded by the Shine On Foundation which is based in Melbourne.

See also

Homelessness in Australia

References

External links 
 ABC TV video interview
 Website

Charities based in Australia
Non-profit organisations based in Queensland
Organizations established in 2014
Homelessness in Australia
2014 establishments in Australia
Laundry organizations